Abdelaziz Touilbini (born October 16, 1978) is an Algerian boxer. He is best known for having competed in the 2008 Olympics in the Heavyweight division.

Career
In 2007, Touilbini won bronze at the All-Africa Games after losing to eventual winner Mourad Sahraoui in the semifinal.

Touibini beat David Assienne and Mohamed Arjaoui at the Olympic qualifier. He lost his Olympic debut to Deontay Wilder 4:10.

External links
 All Africans 2007
 Results of the Qualifier
 sports-reference

1978 births
Living people
Heavyweight boxers
Olympic boxers of Algeria
Boxers at the 2008 Summer Olympics
Algerian male boxers
African Games bronze medalists for Algeria
African Games medalists in boxing
Competitors at the 2007 All-Africa Games
21st-century Algerian people
20th-century Algerian people